Sarah-Jane Cook is an English cricketer and former member of the England women's cricket team   She was born in 1966 and played one Test match, against New Zealand, and four one day internationals.

References

External links
 

Living people
England women Test cricketers
England women One Day International cricketers
1966 births
Sussex women cricketers